In graph-theoretic mathematics, a biregular graph or semiregular bipartite graph is a bipartite graph  for which every two vertices on the same side of the given bipartition have the same degree as each other.

Example
Every complete bipartite graph  is -biregular.
The rhombic dodecahedron is another example; it is (3,4)-biregular.

Vertex counts
An -biregular graph  must satisfy the equation .

Symmetry
Every regular bipartite graph is also biregular.
Every edge-transitive graph (disallowing graphs with isolated vertices) that is not also vertex-transitive must be biregular. In particular every edge-transitive graph is either regular or biregular.

Configurations
The Levi graphs of geometric configurations are biregular; a biregular graph is the Levi graph of an (abstract) configuration if and only if its girth is at least six.

References

Bipartite graphs